In geometry, the great dodecahedron is a Kepler–Poinsot polyhedron, with Schläfli symbol  and Coxeter–Dynkin diagram of . It is one of four nonconvex regular polyhedra. It is composed of 12 pentagonal faces (six pairs of parallel pentagons), intersecting each other making a pentagrammic path, with five pentagons meeting at each vertex.

The discovery of the  great dodecahedron is sometimes credited to Louis Poinsot in 1810, though there is a  drawing of something very similar to a great dodecahedron in the 1568 book Perspectiva Corporum Regularium by Wenzel Jamnitzer.

The great dodecahedron can be constructed analogously to the pentagram, its two-dimensional analogue, via the extension of the -pentagonal polytope faces of the core -polytope (pentagons for the great dodecahedron, and line segments for the pentagram) until the figure again closes.

Images

Related polyhedra 

It shares the same edge arrangement as the convex regular icosahedron; the compound with both is the small complex icosidodecahedron.

If only the visible surface is considered, it has the same topology as a triakis icosahedron with concave pyramids rather than convex ones. The excavated dodecahedron can be seen as the same process applied to a regular dodecahedron, although this result is not regular.

A truncation process applied to the great dodecahedron produces a series of nonconvex uniform polyhedra. Truncating edges down to points produces the dodecadodecahedron as a rectified great dodecahedron. The process completes as a birectification, reducing the original faces down to points, and producing the small stellated dodecahedron.

Usage 

 This shape was the basis for the Rubik's Cube-like Alexander's Star puzzle.
 The great dodecahedron provides an easy mnemonic for the binary Golay code

See also
Compound of small stellated dodecahedron and great dodecahedron

References

External links 
 
 
 Uniform polyhedra and duals
 Metal sculpture of Great Dodecahedron

Kepler–Poinsot polyhedra
Regular polyhedra
Polyhedral stellation
Toroidal polyhedra